is a Japanese electronic and hip-hop duo formed in 2003. Since 2006 they have released music under their own independent record label GAL. The group is on indefinite hiatus as of 2016.

Members 

The composer of the duo's music. He also performs as a solo artist under the same name.

The group's rapper. He is also the guitarist and vocalist for the post-hardcore band uri gagarn.

Discography

Albums 
 FAN (2008-04-09)
 _ (pronounced "underbar") (2010-06-02)
 DAY (2012-10-10)
 MAP (2015-07-01)

EPs 
 foods (September 27, 2006)
 ESCORT (April 22, 2009)

Singles 
 BPA (March 22, 2006)
 HEART (March 16, 2011)
 HALF (August 21, 2011)
 MONKEY / JUDGE (April 4, 2012)
 MANSION (October 10, 2013)
 THERAPY (Pasocom Music Club Remix) (May 29, 2020)

Remix albums 
 System Kitchen (January 17, 2007)

Compilations 

 foods & System Kitchen (2015-04-01)

Live videos 
 one camera no cut (DVD, March 22, 2006)
 SET  (DVD, November 27, 2013)

In popular culture 
From April to June 2012, their song "JUDGE" was used as the ending theme for the TV Tokyo series Moya-Moya Summers 2. From October to December of the same year, the song "9" appeared as the ending theme of the TV Tokyo variety show God Tan ~The God Tongue.

References

External links 
group_inou official website 

Japanese hip hop groups